Serrulacaulis was a genus of early land plant with branching axes. Known fossils are of Late Devonian age.

A cladogram published in 2004 by Crane et al. places Serrulacaulis in the core of a paraphyletic stem group of broadly defined "zosterophylls", basal to the lycopsids (living and extinct clubmosses and relatives).

References

External links
 Cladogram from 

Zosterophylls
Prehistoric lycophyte genera
Devonian plants
Devonian extinctions